Knurr and spell (also called northern spell, nipsy or trap ball) is an old English game, once popular as a pub game.

History
The game originated in the moors of Yorkshire, in England, but then spread throughout the north of England. It can be traced back to the beginning of the 14th century. It was especially popular in the 18th and 19th centuries, but was virtually unknown by the 21st century, though there was a local revival in the 1970s. As late as the 1930s exhibition games of knur and spell by veterans drew large crowds to the Rusland Valley in North Lancashire, according to the chronicles of the North-West Evening Mail, but even then it was regarded as an archaic game.

A man from Golcar, West Yorkshire was recorded in 1974 for the Survey of English Dialects discussing knurr and spell being played around the turn of the twentieth century.

Etymology
Knurr (from Middle English: knurre, knot) refers to a hardwood or pottery ball, as could be made from a knot of wood.

The game around Barnsley was known as "potty knocking".

Equipment and play
In Yorkshire it is played with a levered wooden trap known as a spell, by means of which the knurr, about the size of a walnut, is thrown into the air. In Lancashire the knurr is suspended stationary from string. The knurr is struck by the player with the stick. The object of the game is to hit the knurr the greatest possible distance, either in one or several hits. Each player competes as an individual, without interference, and any number can enter a competition.

This was swung in both hands, although shorter bats for one hand were sometimes used. The stroke is made by a full swing round the head, not unlike a drive in golf.

Originally the ball was thrown into the air by striking a lever upon which it rested in the spell or trap, but in the later development of the game a spell or trap furnished with a spring was introduced, thus ensuring regularity in the height to which the knurr is tossed, somewhat after the manner of the shooter's clay pigeon. By means of a thumb screw, the player can adjust the spring of the spell or trap according to the velocity of release desired for the ball.

On a large moor, and where the game is general, the ground is marked out with wooden pins driven in every . In matches each player supplies their own knurrs and spells and has five rises of the ball to a game.

See also
 Bat and trap
 Tip-cat
 Origins of baseball
 Pub games
 Stoolball

References

External links
 Ower Bit Bog Oil (1963-1964), documentary film explaining Knurr and Spell and showing the game being played. (Yorkshire Film Archive Online)
 Knur & Spell, Nipsy etc. - History and Information
 BBC Archives tweet with film of the 1972 "World Championship"

Ball and bat games
History of Yorkshire
Sport in Yorkshire